Babushkin (masculine) or Babushkina (feminine) may refer to:
Babushkin (surname) (Babushkina), Russian surname
Babushkin (town), a town in the Republic of Buryatia, Russia
Babushkin, a former town in Moscow Oblast, Russian SFSR, Soviet Union; currently a part of Moscow known as Babushkinsky District, Moscow
Babushkin Bay, a bay in the Sea of Okhotsk

See also
Babushka (disambiguation)
Babushkinsky (disambiguation)